Laslo Šuranji, (born November 6, 1978) is a Serbian male paralympic shooter competing in the rifle events. He won a gold and bronze medal at the 2016 Summer Paralympics in Rio de Janeiro.

Early life
Šuranji has paraplegia as a result of injuries he sustained jumping into shallow water.

References

External links
Laslo Šranji Profile

Living people
1978 births
Place of birth missing (living people)
Wheelchair category Paralympic competitors
Paralympic shooters of Serbia
Shooters at the 2016 Summer Paralympics
Shooters at the 2020 Summer Paralympics
Medalists at the 2016 Summer Paralympics
Medalists at the 2020 Summer Paralympics
Paralympic gold medalists for Serbia
Paralympic silver medalists for Serbia
Paralympic bronze medalists for Serbia
Paralympic medalists in shooting
People with paraplegia